Aliabad (also Romanized as ‘Alīābād) is a village in Sudlaneh Rural District, in the Central District of Quchan County, Razavi Khorasan Province, Iran. At the 2006 census, its population was 1,261, in 374 families.

See also 

 List of cities, towns and villages in Razavi Khorasan Province

References 

Populated places in Quchan County